Payengxa Lor (born March 25, 2001) is a Laotian model, self taught english teacher, and beauty pageant titleholder, who was crowned Miss Universe Laos 2022. She is the first Hmong to compete and place in the Top 16 from her country. As Miss Universe Laos, Lor represented Laos at the Miss Universe 2022 held in New Orleans, US and placed Top 16,

Early and personal life
Lor was born and lived in Xiangkhouang Province. She is a business management student at Lao-American College Vientiane.

Pageantry

Miss Universe Laos 2022 
On October 8, 2022, Lor competed against 19 other candidates at Miss Universe Laos 2022 at the Grand Ballroom of Mekong Riverside Hotel in Vientiane and won the title along with three special awards as Miss Perfect Skin by Renita Beauty Center, Miss Confident Smile by 4U Spa Dental and Scent of Beauty by Madame Fin. She is the first Hmong/Laotian intop at Miss Universe.

Miss Universe 2022 
On January 14, 2023, Lor represented Laos at Miss Universe 2022 at the Ernest N. Morial Convention Center in New Orleans, Louisiana, US. In the final event, she won the fan vote and placed the Top 16 semifinalist. She is the first Laotian to enter the semifinalist at Miss Universe.

References

Living people
2001 births
Laotian beauty pageant winners
Laotian models
People from Vientiane
Miss Universe 2022 contestants